Telegraph is a ghost town on State Highway 377, 13 miles (20 km) southwest of Junction, in Kimble County, Texas, United States.

History
Biographer Robert A. Caro notes, "the town had no telegraph; it had been given its name because telegraph poles had been cut from trees near there during the 1850s."

Ruth Holmes was appointed the first postmaster, when Telegraph was assigned a post office on February 17, 1900.

By the 1890,  ranches were established in the surrounding area of the Texas Hill Country. During the 1920s, camping on the river  near Telegraph was a popular vacation spot for campers, hunters, and fishermen, with  the only building of the town serving as  the residence/country store/post office (which closed in 2009).   In 1925, Telegraph had rental cabins on the river, and a gas station-post office-general store (residence of the postmaster).

The general store and post office, built 1890-1900, was designated a Recorded Texas Historic Landmark in 1996, marker number 5219.

Telegraph was about a mile from the ranch built by Governor Coke Stevenson,
known as "Mr. Texas".

Notable persons
Governor Coke Stevenson

Climate
The climate in this area is characterized by hot, humid summers and generally mild to cool winters.  According to the Köppen climate classification system, Telegraph has a humid subtropical climate, Cfa on climate maps.

References

Recorded Texas Historic Landmarks
Ghost towns in Central Texas
Populated places in Kimble County, Texas